Greytown is a town situated on the banks of a tributary of the Umvoti River in a richly fertile timber-producing area of KwaZulu-Natal, South Africa.

History
Greytown was established in the 1850s and named after the governor of the Cape Colony Sir George Edward Grey who later became Premier of New Zealand. A Lutheran church was built in 1854. A church bell which was brought to the town for the Dutch Reformed Church in 1861 to summon worshipers. The Dutch and English congregations were the centre of a series of theological arguments and the church bell was stolen and buried, only to be found 74 years later upon the construction of some cottages near the old church. A strikingly designed Town Hall was opened in 1904. In 1906 following a poll tax and other oppressive measures imposed on the Zulus, the Bambatha Rebellion took place.

The final resting place of Sarie Marais is at Greytown. Sarie was a legendary Voortrekker woman who died, aged 37, with the birth of her 11th child and is immortalised by the eponymous song, an indelible part of South African culture.
Louis Botha, the Second Boer War General and first Prime Minister of the Union of South Africa, was born on a farm 5 km south of Greytown. The old farmhouse was destroyed by British Forces during search and destroy operations. Louis Botha led the Boer forces during their victory over the British at the Battle of Spion Kop.

Artist Wonderboy Nxumalo was born in Greytown, and died there in 2008.

Education

Wembley College is also a private school in Greytown. It has boarding and uses the Cambridge system.

References

Populated places in the Umvoti Local Municipality
1850s establishments in the British Empire